Tenuifilum thalassicum is a species of thermophilic bacteria.

References

Bacteroidia